Tom McCabe is a former association football player who represented New Zealand at international level.

McCabe made his full All Whites debut in a 2–3 loss to Australia on 18 August 1958 and ended his international playing career with five A-international caps to his credit, his final cap an appearance in a 2–1 win over New Caledonia on 14 September 1958.

References 

Living people
New Zealand association footballers
New Zealand international footballers
1933 births
Association football forwards
Irish emigrants to New Zealand
NIFL Premiership players
League of Ireland players
People from Dundalk
Association footballers from County Louth
Dundalk F.C. players
Lisburn Distillery F.C. players
Portadown F.C. players
Glentoran F.C. players